Haata Dhari Chalutha is a 2013 Oriya romantic movie directed by Himansu Parija. It was produced by Anubhav Mohanty & Anuprash Mohanty. The film stars with Anubhav Mohanty and Barsha Priyadarshini in lead roles. The music was given by Prem Anand. The film released on 14 June 2013. The film was a remake of Telugu film Solo.

Synopsis
Sai is an orphan, who wants to marry a girl from a joint family to get blessing from elders. He falls in love with Samparna who belongs to a joint family. He tries to woo her and finally she falls in love with him. Samparna shares a very good relationship with everyone at home, especially her parent Abinash & Sumitra. When Abinash Choudhury finds his daughter's relationship with an orphan, he strongly disapproves it. Abinash wants his daughter should marry a boy from influential family. But at last he agrees and approves the marriage of Sai and Sampurna.

Cast
 Anubhav Mohanty as Sai
 Barsa Priyadarshini as Samparna
 Bijay Mohanty as Abinash Choudhury
 Gudu as Sai's friend
 Tandra Ray as Sumitra Choudhury
 Debu Bose as Ekta's husband
 Kuna Tripathy as Dushmant Kumar
 Jaya as Samurna's friend
 Runu Parija as Seema
 Minaketan Das as Sangram (as Minaketan)
 Harihara Mahapatra as Lecturer
 Salil Mitra as Amresh
 Pinky as Sampurna's sister
 Namrata Das as Ekta
 Pintu Nanda as Henchman

Production
The film was previously planned with an English title  Made for each other, but The director Himanshu Parija convinced the producers to keep an Oriya name for the title.

Soundtrack
The music for the movie was composed by Prem Anand. The audio was released in Cuttack (Odisha) on 20 April 2013 .

Awards
 Filmfare Awards East
 Best Oriya Film (Nominated)
 Best Oriya director(Nominated)- Himanshu Parija
 Best Oriya Actor (Nominated)-Anubhav Mohanty
 Best Oriya Actress (Nominated)-Barsa Priyadarshini 
 Tarang Cine Awards 2014
 Best Film
 Best Actor - Anubhav Mohanty
 Best Dialogue - Bijaya Malla

Box office
It received excellent reviews by critics, and the film did good business at box office.

References

External links
 

2013 films
Odia remakes of Telugu films
2010s Odia-language films